Mário Ferreira dos Santos (January 3, 1907 – April 11, 1968) was a Brazilian philosopher, translator, writer and anarchist activist. Born in Tietê, São Paulo, Ferreira dos Santos was raised in Pelotas, Rio Grande do Sul, and graduated in Law and Social Sciences at the Federal University of Rio Grande do Sul.

A prolific writer and thinker, Ferreira dos Santos published in less than fifteen years the 45-volume Encyclopedia of Philosophical and Social Sciences.

Philosophical work
He created a philosophical system called "concrete philosophy." His system was based on the méthode des démonstrations géométriques which, according to Ferreira, no possibility of disagreement from its assumptions – which he called "theses". The first thesis is the very foundation of his philosophy: "There is something whilst there isn't the absolute nothing", from which he draws other theses through the methods of geometry.

Selected works

Session I - Enciclopédia das ciências filosóficas Primeira série
 Filosofia e cosmovisão (1952)
 Lógica e Dialética (1954)
 Psicologia (1954)
 Teoria do conhecimento (gnosiologia e criteriologia) (1954)
 Ontologia e cosmologia (1954)
 Tratado de simbólica (1954)
 Filosofia da Crise (1956)
 O homem perante o infinito (1964)
 Noologia Geral (1956)
 Logos (1964)
 Filosofia concreta (1957)

Second series
(A) Published

 Filosofia Concreta dos Valores (1960)
 Sociologia fundamental (1957)
 Pitgoras e o tema do número (1956)
 Aristóteles e as Mutações (1955)
 O Um e o Múltiplo em Platão (1958)
 Métodos Lógicos e Dialéticos (1959)
 Filosofia da afirmação e da negação (1959)
 Tratado de economia, 2 vols. (1962)
 Análise de temas sociais, 3 vols. (1962)
 Dicionário de Filosofia e Ciências Culturais (1963)
 Origem dos Grandes Erros Filosóficos (1965)
 Grandezas e misérias da logística (1967)
 Erros na filosofia da natureza (1967)
 Das categorias, of the Aristotles Portuguese translated (1960)
 Isagoge, of the Porfirius Portuguese translated (1965)
 Protagoras, of the Plato Portuguese translated (1965)
 O apocalipse de São João: A revelação dos livros sagrados (1998)

(B) Unpublished
 Comentários a S. Boaventura 100p.
 As três críticas de Kant 226p.
 Comentários aos "Versos Áureos" de Pitágoras 88p.
 Cristianismo, a religião do homem 69p.
 Tao Te Ching, of the Lao-Tse 85p.

(C) Scattered and fragments
 Filosofia e romantismo 42p.
 Brasil, país de excepção 50p.

 A Sabedoria dos Princípios (1967)
 A Sabedoria da Unidade (1967)

References

1907 births
1968 deaths
20th-century Brazilian philosophers
Anarchist writers
Anti-fascists
Brazilian anarchists
Brazilian anti-communists
Brazilian Christians
Brazilian male writers
Brazilian non-fiction writers
Brazilian philosophers
Christian anarchists
Commentators on Aristotle
Epistemologists
Federal University of Rio Grande do Sul alumni
Metaphysicians
Mutualists
Ontologists
People from Tietê, São Paulo